Fred Dewey  (11 October 1898 – 18 January 1980) was a Welsh international footballer. He was part of the Wales national football team, playing 2 matches. He played his first match on 25  October 1930 against Scotland and his last match on against England.

See also
 List of Wales international footballers (alphabetical)

References

External links
 

1898 births
Welsh footballers
Wales international footballers
Footballers from Cardiff
1980 deaths
Association football defenders
Cardiff Corinthians F.C. players
Year of death unknown